Tandlianwala is a town in Punjab, Pakistan and the headquarters of Tandlianwala Tehsil. It is located 40 km from the city of Faisalabad and 45 km from Okara. It is a sub-division of Faisalabad District and has a Tehsil municipal administration (TMA).

History
The town was established as a mandi (market) during the colonization of west Punjab. In 1887, it received the status of sub tehsil when Manzoor Wattoo was elected as MPA from the constituency and later became the CM Punjab. The town committee came into being in 1965. From 1966 to 1990, the town expanded rapidly due to the construction of a bridge over the Ravi River. Is is also a ghee supplier mandi and chamra mandi since 1979. There were also karkhanas for processing of rawhides.  Before the independence of Pakistan, the city was a food supplier for Faisalabad District and nearby areas. The original name of the city is Tandla Mandi (Tandla Market).
Lately, Tehsil is linked directly to Sahiwal city by a newly formed bridge on river Ravi. Tehsil of Tandlianwala came in contact with motorway(Lahore to Karachi) which is part of CPEC.

Geography
The Ravi River flows about 9 km in the east which is the main source of irrigation meeting the requirements of 90% of cultivated land.

There are no natural boundaries between Tandlianwala and adjoining tehsil and districts. The city is bound on the north by Faisalabad, on the east by Okara, on the south by Sahiwal and Toba Tek Singh and on the west by Samundri.

Geology
The Tehsil of Tandlianwala is part of the alluvial plains between the Himalayan foothills and the central core of the Indian subcontinent. The alluvial deposits are typically over 1000 thick. The scalloped interfluves are believed to have been formed during the Late Pleistocene and feature flat-topped river terraces. These were later identified as old and young floodplains of the River Ravi on the Kamalia and Chenab Plains. The old floodplains consist of Holocene deposits from the River Ravi. There is also a small river passing through the center of the city.

The soil consists of young stratified silt loams or very fine sand loams which give the subsoil a very weak structure with common kankers at only five feet. The course of the rivers within Tandlianwala are winding and often subject to frequent alterations. In the rainy season, the currents are very strong. This leads to high floods in certain areas which last for a number of days. The Rakh and Gogera canals have encouraged the water levels in the district however the belt on the river Ravi has remained narrow. The river bed includes the river channels which have shifted the sand bars and low sandy levees leading to river erosion.

Demographics
As per the Population Census Report of 1998, the town is spread over an area of 1284 Square Kilometers with a total population of 540,802 which was almost 702,733 in 2017, indicating that the growth rate of the city is 3.37 percent per annum. Before the partition there was a majority of Sikhs and Hindus in the city, then migrated to India, while settlements of Muslim refugees from East Punjab and Haryana who came from India. There are two other urban localities in Tandlianwala Municipal committee: Mamoon Kanjan and Kanjwani. The Town has 28 Union Councils, three Urban and 25 Rural Union Councils.

There is a Police Chowki and Police Station in the city which was established in 1905 by the British covering an area of 680 sq. kilometres. There are four police stations: City Tandlianwala, Sadar Tandlianwala, Police Station Garh and Police Station Bahlak Thana.

Religion and ethnic groups 
The majority religion is Islam, making up 98.0% of the city with small minorities of Christians (1.8%) and others (0.2%), mainly Sikhs and Ahmadis. The majority of Muslims belong to Sunni, Hanafi, and Barelvi schools of thought with a minority of Shiites. The major castes of Tehsil are Baloch and Wattoos which are the main political forces of the area too. Hence, the politics here revolves around the Biradari system and clan patronage. The castes in the city and villages are:Mahar Sipra Arain,  Gujjar, Syed, Jats, Wattoo, Awan, Baloch, Sipra, Bhatti, Bhutta, Chishti, Gill,, Jalahe, Khichi, Khokhar, Kumhar, Lodhi, Malik, Maachhi, Mirasi, Paracha, Dhobi, Qasayi, Qureshi, Rajput, Rana, Rao, Rawal, Sheikh, Sherazi, Sial, Sahmal (Jats), Tiwana, Toor, Warraich (Jats), Sudrech and others.

Climate
Tandlianwala has a hot desert climate (BWh) in the Köppen-Geiger classification.

The summer season starts from April and continues until October. May, June and July are the hottest months. The winter season starts from November and continues until March. December, January and February are the coldest months.

Sports
Tandlianwala has many popular sports like cricket, football and volleyball, Kabaddi, Wrestling (Kushti), Badminton, Table Tennis, Marshall arts and local desi games. The boys of Tandlianwala city play cricket in the evenings, mostly on the grounds of MC High School ground, the Doonga Ground and newly built cricket stadium.

Cricket stadium is newly built which has good national standards. There is also a very good facility of sports complex which contains many indoor sports arenas. The badminton court is also available in the front of munciple library apart from the one present in sports complex.

Agriculture
The town is also well known because of the high quality of sugarcane. It has two sugar mills and a dozen of cotton factories, rice factories and flour mills. The city is traditionally known for pure Desi Ghee, though it is rare now.

The people of this city took an active part in the struggle for independence of Pakistan (Freedom Movement). The city was originally developed around a grain market. Its police station was established as early as 1905 and prior to that only a police checkpost existed.

Politically, it is the most important Tehsil of Faisalabad District. Mian Manzoor Wattoo, the former chief minister of Punjab was elected from this constituency in 1993, while he lost in his home constituency.

The name of the city comes from a herb "Tandla", which was grown in abundance.

Economics
Tandlianwala is home to a major grain, whole corn and sugar market, and it was populer for chrma mandi which were started by late Haji Ghulam Muhammad paracha mahoon, and now runnig by his sons haji  Bashir ahmad and shabbir aad paracha, Mahi chowk is the main commercial market of the city and aldo known for a dessert Mannpasand. Other markets in the city include Ghala Mandi , Chamra mandi mohallah shamspura stret no 4,  Rail Bazar, Nehar Bazar, Naya Bazar, Anarkali Bazar, Quaid-e-Azam Road, (Samundri Road) and Faisalabad Road.

Major banks and offices in Tandlianwala:

 National Bank of Pakistan
 Bank of Punjab
 Zarai Taraqiati Bank Limited
 Habib Bank Limited
 Allied Bank Limited
 MCB Bank Limited
 United Bank Limited
 TCS Pvt Limited

Healthcare
A 40-bed modern Tehsil Headquarters Hospital, Tandlianwala became functional in March 2021.

Transport
 Tandliawala railway station is present which connects city to other cities. City also has a Lorry Adda (Bus Terminal) which has buses which operates to nearby cities. Tandla has another transport facility, Taimoor Terminal which majorly connect Faisalabad and Okara to the city via vans. Now, this terminal also has facility of skyways bus service to RWP/ISB and also to Lahore via new motorway.

Notable people and places 
Naz Khialvi, lyricist and radio broadcaster.
Rai Ahmad Khan Kharal

References

Cities and towns in Faisalabad District